Lakeview Junior - Senior High School is a public secondary school, serving junior and senior high school grades, in Campti, Louisiana, United States. It is a part of the Natchitoches Parish School Board.

It is located east of Campti on Louisiana Highway 9. The school is 55 percent white in enrollment, drawing students from around the parish. Students from as far north as Ashland attend Lakeview.

Athletics
Lakeview Senior High athletics competes in the LHSAA.

References

External links
 Lakeview High School

Education in Ark-La-Tex
Education in Natchitoches Parish, Louisiana
Public high schools in Louisiana
Public middle schools in Louisiana